Alfred Pinner (14 November 1891 – 1976) was a British gymnast. He competed in the men's team all-around event at the 1920 Summer Olympics.

References

1891 births
1976 deaths
British male artistic gymnasts
Olympic gymnasts of Great Britain
Gymnasts at the 1920 Summer Olympics
Sportspeople from Ipswich